Lithium lanthanum zirconium oxide (LLZO, Li7La3Zr2O12) or lithium lanthanum zirconate is a lithium-stuffed garnet material that is under investigation for its use in solid-state electrolytes in lithium-based battery technologies. LLZO has a high ionic conductivity and chemical stability against lithium metal, giving it an advantage for use as an electrolyte in solid-state batteries.

Press reports have stated that LLZO is believed to be the electrolyte used by QuantumScape for their solid-state lithium metal battery.

LLZO has also been used as an electrolyte material in next-generation lithium-sulfur batteries.

References 

Zirconates
Lithium compounds
Lanthanum compounds
Garnet group